Bolba is a village in the Bolba CD block in the Simdega subdivision of the Simdega district in the Indian state of Jharkhand.

Geography

Location
Bolba is located at

Area overview
In the area presented in the map alongside, “the landscape is formed of hills and undulating plateau” in the south-western part of the Chota Nagpur Plateau. About 32% of the district is covered with forests (mark the shaded portions in the map.) It is an overwhelmingly rural area with 92.83% of the population living in the rural areas.  A major portion of the rural population depends on rain-fed agriculture (average annual rainfall: 1,100-1,200 mm) for a living.

Note: The map alongside presents some of the notable locations in the district. All places marked in the map are linked in the larger full screen map.

Civic administration
There is a police station at Bolba. 
 
The headquarters of Bolba CD block are located at Bolba village.

Demographics
According to the 2011 Census of India, Bolba had a total population of 1,489, of which 683 (46%) were males and 806 (54%) were females. Population in the age range 0–6 years was 237. The total number of literate persons in Bolba was 968 (77.32% of the population over 6 years.

(*For language details see Bolba block#Language and religion)

Education
S.S. High School  Bolba is a Hindi-medium coeducational institution established in 1966. It has facilities for teaching in class VI to class XII. The school has a library with 147 books.

Kasturba Gandhi Balika Vidyalaya is a Hindi-medium girls only institution established in 2007. It has facilities for teaching in class VI to class XII. The school has a playground and a library with 860 books and has 5 computers for teaching and learning purposes.

Project Girls High School Bolba is a Hindi-medium girls only institution established at Pakarbahar in 1984. It has facilities for teaching in class VI to class X. The school has a playground and a library with 102 books.

Healthcare
There is a Community Health Centre (Hospital) at Bolba.

References

Villages in Simdega district